New Bridge may refer to:

Bridges
 Chester New Bridge, County Durham, England
 Most Slovenského Národného Povstania (called the Nový Most, for New Bridge, until 2012), over the Danube in Bratislava, Slovakia
 New Bridge (Dublin), over the River Dodder in Dublin, Ireland
 New Bridge, Mitrovica, a bridge completed in 2001 over the Ibar between North Mitrovica and Mitrovica, Kosovo
 Newbridge, River Dart, a bridge completed in 1413 over the River Dart in Dartmoor, England
 Pont Neuf (New Bridge), a bridge completed in 1607 over the Seine in Paris, France
 Puente Nuevo (New Bridge), a bridge completed in 1793 over a -deep chasm in Ronda, Spain

Other
 New Bridge, Georgia, United States
 New Bridge Landing, in New Jersey, United States
 New Bridge Landing (NJT station), in New Jersey, United States
 New Bridge, Newfoundland and Labrador, Canada
 Shinbashi, in Tokyo

See also
 Newbridge (disambiguation)